William Edward Armytage Axon  (13 January 1846 – 27 December 1913) was an English librarian, antiquary and journalist for the Manchester Guardian. He contributed to the Dictionary of National Biography under his initials W. E. A. A. He was also a notable vegetarianism activist.

Biography

Axon was born in Chorlton-on-Medlock, Manchester. He was best known as an antiquary and a bibliographer, but his interests were extremely varied. As honorary secretary of the Manchester and Salford Sunday Society he took a prominent part in the agitation for the opening of the Manchester libraries on Sunday. Axon had begun life as a boy in the Manchester Reference Library, and was early drawn to literary pursuits. Later he wrote much on the folklore and historical associations of Lancashire and Cheshire, and the antiquaries of these counties made him their president. Besides this, as a member of the English Dialect Society Axon wrote many tales and sketches illustrating the dialect and customs of the county in which he lived.

Axon married Jane Woods in 1866; they had three children. After Jane's death in 1899, he married Setta Lueft; they had one child.

Axon was also the author of Cobden as a Citizen in 1907. He published his study of Anna Jane Vardill's poem that was a sequel to Coleridge's poem Christabel in 1908. It was claimed that she had not written it but based on new evidence he was able to assure the Royal Society of Literature that the poem had been written by her. Axon's second wife died in 1910.

Axon for 30 years was on the literary staff of the Manchester Guardian, and for his general literary work was distinguished by the University of Manchester, which conferred on him the honorary degree of Master of Arts in 1913. He was a Fellow of the Royal Society of Literature, an honorary LL.D. of Wilberforce University, and had contributed articles to the Encyclopædia Britannica, Dictionary of National Biography, American Encyclopædia, and Notes and Queries.

Axon died at home on 27 December 1913 and was buried at St Paul's Church in Kersal, Manchester.

Vegetarianism

Axon was an ardent vegetarian and member of the Anti-Tobacco League. He has been described as a "leading figure of the
vegetarian movement." He was Vice-President and Hon. Secretary of the Vegetarian Society. Axon contributed articles on the history of vegetarianism to John Harvey Kellogg's Good Health journal. He was editor of the Vegetarian Messenger.

Axon wrote the preface for the 1884 edition of Percy Bysshe Shelley's A Vindication of Natural Diet. He also authored Shelley's Vegetarianism, in 1891.

Historian Ina Zweiniger-Bargielowska has noted that "Axon abhorred cruelty to animals and the degrading work of the 'slaughterman, reeking with blood and striking to death with remorseless blows a creature that shares with him the gift of life".

Bibliography

1877: Handbook of the Public Libraries of Manchester and Salford. Manchester: Abel Heywood and Son.
1879: John Ruskin: A Bibliographical Biography.
1883: Lancashire Gleanings.
1884: Cheshire Gleanings. 
1888: Stray Chapters in Literature, Folk-lore, and Archaeology.
1890: Thomas Taylor, the Platonist.
1891:  Shelley's Vegetarianism.
1893: The Literature of Vegetarianism.
1897: Bygone Sussex.
1899: Echoes of Old Lancashire.
1899: Ortensio Lando, a humorist of the Renaissance
1907: Cobden as a Citizen
1908: Anna Jane Vardill Niven

Edited works
1886: The Annals of Manchester: a chronological record from the earliest times to the end of 1885. Manchester: J. Heywood, Deansgate and Ridgefield ("The volume now offered to the public, as a revised edition of the Manchester Historical Recorder, is virtually a new work ...". - preface); electronic version  
 Collected sermons, 1631–1659 of Thomas Fuller, Volume 1 edited by John Eglington Bailey. Completed by William E. A. Axon (1891)
 Collected sermons, 1631–1659 Volume 2 edited by John Eglington Bailey. Completed by William E. A. Axon (1891)

Contributions to the DNB

Ashworth, John
Banks, George Linnaeus
Bellot, Thomas
Bennis, George Geary
Blythe, John Dean
Bowers, George Hull
Bradberry, David
Brandwood, James
Brittain, Thomas
Brooke, Henry
Brookes, Joshua
Brotherton, Edward
Bruen, John
Butterworth, James
Calvert, Charles
Calvert, Thomas
Canne, John 
Castillo, John
Caw, John Young
Clayton, John (1754–1843)
Cole, Thomas (1628–1697)
Crestadoro, Andrea

Notes

References
 Obituary: Dr. William Edward Armytage Axon in The Times, December 30, 1913; Issue 40407; pg. 9; col B

Attribution

External links
 
 
 
 
 William Axon papers at the John Rylands Library, University of Manchester.

1846 births
1913 deaths
19th-century English historians
20th-century English historians
Anti-smoking activists
British vegetarianism activists
English antiquarians
English biographers
English librarians
English male journalists
English temperance activists
Historians of vegetarianism
Lancashire and Cheshire Antiquarian Society
Manchester Literary and Philosophical Society
Male biographers
People associated with the Vegetarian Society
Writers from Manchester